Ctenyura is a genus of ascidian tunicates in the family Pyuridae.

Species within the genus Ctenyura include:
 Ctenyura comma (Hartmeyer, 1906) 
 Ctenyura intermedia Van Name, 1918 
 Ctenyura tetraplexa Kott, 1985 
 Ctenyura tortuosa Kott, 1985

References

Stolidobranchia
Tunicate genera